The Women's 3000 metres steeplechase at the 2012 Summer Olympics took place on 4–6 August at the Olympic Stadium.

From the gun in the final, reigning world champion Yuliya Zaripova sprinted out to the lead and dictated the pace.  But rather than continuing to accelerate, she slowed, with the rest of the field bunching behind with nobody willing to go around.  The pack slowly disintegrated by attrition.  With 3 laps to go a group of seven had separated, including all three Ethiopians, plus Milcah Chemos Cheywa, Mercy Wanjiku Njoroge and Habiba Ghribi, all still behind Zaripova. On the 6th lap, defending champion and World Record holder Gulnara Galkina, already off the back, made a right turn and stepped off the track.  The pace quickened, losing Etenesh Diro and Njoroge at the water jump.  Zaripova just continued to accelerate.  On the back stretch Ghribi looked to be clear of the other three but almost put her hand out so as not to pass Zaripova.  From that point, Zaripova just extended her lead with Ghribi clearly in second place.  Sofia Assefa broke away from her teammate Hiwot Ayalew.  Down the home stretch Cheywa made a late run but Assefa held on for the bronze medal. Compared to the previous year's world championships, the first two medalists were the same, Zaripova a second faster for her personal record, Ghribi was 3 seconds faster for her Tunisian national record, and Assefa 19 seconds faster to push Cheywa off the podium.

On 24 March 2016 the Court of Arbitration for Sport disqualified Yuliya Zaripova's results from 20 July 2011 to 25 July 2013 for doping, which included the Olympics. On 4 June 2016, Tunisian Habiba Ghribi was awarded with the olympic gold medal in a ceremony in Rades, Tunisia, presented by IOC Vice-President Nawal El Moutawakel.

Competition format

The women's 3000 m steeplechase competition consisted of heats and a final.

Records
, the existing World and Olympic records were as follows.

Schedule

All times are British Summer Time (UTC+1)

Results

Round 1

Qual. rule: first 4 of each heat (Q) plus the 3 fastest times (q) qualified.

Heat 1

Heat 2

Heat 3

Final

1 On 24 March 2016, the Court of Arbitration for Sport disqualified Russian Yuliya Zaripova for doping and confirmed that she would be stripped of her gold medal. On 4 June 2016 the gold medal was officially reallocated to second place Habiba Ghribi from Tunisia by the IOC and IAAF updated the results. Marta Dominguez from Spain has been disqualified too.

References

Steeplechase at the Olympics
Women's events at the 2012 Summer Olympics